"The One I Love" is a song by British singer-songwriter David Gray. It was released on 29 August 2005 as the first single from his seventh studio album, Life in Slow Motion (2005). The song was produced by Marius de Vries and is Gray's second-highest achievement on the UK Singles Chart, peaking at number eight. Worldwide, the song reached number six in Ireland and number 31 in New Zealand. The single was released as a two-CD single and 7-inch vinyl set.

"Everybody's Leaving Town", the B-side on CD1 and the 7-inch, also appears on the Japanese version of Life in Slow Motion as a bonus track.

Track listings
UK CD1 and 7-inch vinyl
 "The One I Love"
 "Going in Blind" (piano and string version)

UK CD2
 "The One I Love" (acoustic)
 "With Open Arms"
 "Everybody's Leaving Town"

European CD single
 "The One I Love" (album version)
 "With Open Arms"
 "Everybody's Leaving Town"

Charts

Weekly charts

Year-end charts

Certifications

Release history

References

2005 singles
2005 songs
Atlantic Records singles
David Gray (musician) songs
Song recordings produced by Marius de Vries
Songs written by David Gray (musician)